Nathalie Lee Baw (born April 9, 1985) is a Mauritian former swimmer, who specialized in sprint freestyle events. Lee Baw competed for Mauritius, as a 15-year-old, in the women's 100 m freestyle at the 2000 Summer Olympics in Sydney. She received a ticket from FINA, under a Universality program, in an entry time of 1:03.15. She challenged seven other swimmers in heat one, including fellow 15-year-old Maria Awori of Kenya. Coming from fifth at the final turn, Lee Baw edged out Uganda's Supra Singhal on the final stretch to pick up a fourth seed in 1:06.67. Lee Baw failed to advance into the semifinals, as she placed fiftieth overall in the prelims.

References

External links
 

1985 births
Living people
Mauritian female swimmers
Olympic swimmers of Mauritius
Swimmers at the 2000 Summer Olympics
Commonwealth Games competitors for Mauritius
Swimmers at the 2002 Commonwealth Games
Mauritian female freestyle swimmers
Mauritian people of Chinese descent